Diary of a Wimpy Kid: The Getaway is the twelfth book in the Diary of a Wimpy Kid series by Jeff Kinney. The book was unveiled during the 2017 Diary of a Wimpy Kid Virtually Live Event which was live streamed via YouTube as part of the 10th anniversary of the first book. The book was published and released on November 7, 2017. The book is about Greg and his family flying to a resort called Isla de Corales for Christmas. The Heffleys went there because that was the place where Greg's mom & dad went for their honeymoon.

Plot
Greg Heffley and his family see an advertisement for Isla de Corales, a resort where his parents went for their honeymoon, on TV. To Greg's dismay, they skip Christmas to go to the resort instead. After multiple mishaps at the airport, such as their flight being delayed and having to go through the security line twice , the Heffleys board the plane. Greg is disappointed that he has to sit in the coach class seats and is more annoyed when he is seated between a different family with a baby. Because he is a frequent flyer, Frank is given a seat in first class. To his dismay, Susan insists that he share the seat with the rest of the family, with each member taking turns in the seat during the flight. Greg also gets very worried about flying, and a crying baby sitting next to him doesn’t help.

After they land at the resort, Greg and his family find out that the resort has changed since his parents' honeymoon, and most of the activities they did are now on the adult-only section, known as the "wild side". In their hotel room, located in the "mild side", they notice that they claimed the wrong suitcase and theirs was sent back home. The family decide to visit the pool, and because it is too crowded, Greg decides to take a nap on one on one of the sun chairs and is subsequently interrupted by a person known as the "Director of Fun", whose job it is to facilitate rowdy party games for all the guests to play. Apart from that, Greg also gets scared by an iguana, and has his meal ruined by birds and slugs. Frank also falls ill after disregarding Susan's advice to only drink bottled water and ends up with a bad case of Diarrhea   

The next morning, Greg has an encounter with a tarantula that climbed into his slippers, and after a big ordeal of him running around, he loses track of where it went. Being bored, Susan books a banana boat, because she wanted to get a Cum card photo. After Greg drags Rodrick away from the teen zone, where he had hooked up romantically with a girl, the family gets on, however the boat ends up getting punctured. After getting rejected from the golf clubhouse for lunch and an ordeal at the swim up bar, Susan decides to book a more relaxing activity for the night, watching baby turtles hatch. However, that ends up going wrong too, with Rodrick spending the whole night smooching his new girlfriend, and Manny pocketing one of the turtle eggs for himself. 

Fed up with the way the holiday was going, Susan goes for a spa day the next day and Greg is left to take care of his little brother, Manny. He lets Manny play at a water park but ends up falling in water that he believes to be contaminated with urine. After her spa day, Susan is relaxed and books a private snorkeling cruise for the family, but Greg worries about getting stung by a box jellyfish. He takes a gulp of water by accident and believes that he has swallowed a sea horse, ending the snorkeling trip early.

The Heffleys return to the pool. They find out that Manny had taken a box jellyfish in his plastic bucket after the Director of Fun accidentally threw it into the pool. During the commotion, Greg and his family noticed that Rodrick wasn't with them and realize that he must have been left behind at the reef where they snorkeled. They rush back out to the reef and find Rodrick floating in the water where they had left him, badly sunburned. The next day, Greg visits a tennis court, out of fear that the tarantula will reappear. The other kids recognize Greg as one of the people involved with the box jellyfish incident, so he is pounded with tennis balls and forced to climb out of the court, due to the instructor having locked the kids in.

Back at in the hotel room, Manny knocks over the other family's suitcase, and his family tries on the clothes inside which happen to fit them perfectly. They go out to eat in the golf clubhouse but are caught by security due to a tip-off from the other family and are ordered to leave the resort. The Heffleys stay at the airport hotel, and the next day, Greg's parents choose to end things on a high note and sneak back in for a family picture. Whilst walking around, they accidentally run into Rodrick's girlfriend, making out with another boy. After an awkward encounter, Susan asks her to take the Christmas photo, and the family decided to make the most of their time before they would be caught. This ends up happening sooner than expected, as they run into another family who recognizes them and reports them to security. The family split up, with Greg trying to escape on a windsurfing board, ending up in a private nudist beach on the wild side. After crashing the board into the dolphin enclosure, he runs away and notices his family on the other side through a hole in the wall. They try to help him climb over, but the wall falls down, and a lot of people rush in from the mild side (mainly to swim in the wild side's pool, as the mild sides was still being filled up from the box jellyfish incident), letting the Heffleys escape the resort.

After he gets home, Greg shows Rowley the Isla de Corales website and finds that he and his family have been banned from the resort, which is now appealing for information about their identities by posting the failed banana boat photo of the family with X's over their bodies on the front page.

Reception 
A week since its release, it has received 4.5/5 stars on Waterstones with 786 reviews. Common Sense Media gave the book three out of five stars.

References 

Getaway, The
2017 American novels
2017 children's books
American children's novels
Novels by Jeff Kinney
Amulet Books books